The Berryhill Public Schools is a public school district in Tulsa County, Oklahoma, United States, based in Tulsa, Oklahoma.

Schools
The Berryhill Public Schools has an early childhood center, two elementary schools, one middle school, and one high school

Early childhood center
Berryhill Early Childhood Center

Elementary schools
North Elementary School
South Elementary School

Middle school
Berryhill Middle School

High school
 Berryhill High School

Alumni
 Jeremy smith defensive end for Tulsa;
 Kirk Flemings Berryhill Fire Fighter;
 Jimmy Hurley Starfish

Activities
Berryhill's marching band program, the "Blue and Gold Brigade"or simply "The Brigade",has enjoyed great success in spite of its 
small size. They have achieved, most notably; twenty-four state-champion titles by the Oklahoma Bandmasters'
Association; a sixteen-year winning streak as state champions at the OBA 1A-3A State Marching Band lasting from 2004 to 2019; numerous 'superior' 
ratings at OSSAA regional marching competitions; copious amounts of other awards from other competitions.

References

External links

School districts in Oklahoma
Education in Tulsa County, Oklahoma